Evarcha striolata is a species of jumping spider that lives in South Africa. The male was first described in 2009 and the female in 2013.

References

Endemic fauna of South Africa
Salticidae
Spiders of South Africa
Spiders described in 2009
Taxa named by Wanda Wesołowska